Henry James Cambie Secondary is a public high school in Richmond, British Columbia part of School District 38 Richmond. Cambie was the first secondary school in Richmond. When it first started in 1928, it was known as Richmond High. Later on it changed its name to Henry James Cambie Secondary School.  In 1995 Cambie moved to its current location.

External links

School Reports - Ministry of Education
 Satisfaction Survey
 School Performance
 Enrollment Reports

High schools in Richmond, British Columbia
Educational institutions established in 1928
1928 establishments in British Columbia